Ittamadu is an area in Bangalore city in India. Other nearby areas are Hosakerehalli, AG's Layout and Bhuvaneshwari Nagar.

Education 
Institutions such as Webster's School, Presidency Public School, St. Xavier English school and the Nargund group of institutions are located there. 5 star school of ittamadu is chota phool public school Krishna School

Transport 
Bus service is available from Dattetreya Nagara to K.R. Market.
Bus No 45K

Bus Service is available From VB Bakery Bus No  45D AGS Layout to Kempegowda Bus Station every 10 min

Temples 
Popular temples are Sri Raghavendra Swamy Mandira, Shanisvara Temple and Dattetreya Swamy Temple, Rameshawara temple , Anejaneya temple .Bhavani Shankar Temple

Economy 
After 2011, Ittamadu developed quickly in comparison to nearby towns. Housing development has been a massive governmental undertaking, to attract potential residents. Tata Promont is constructing a project in this area which is completed and this place turned itself into uprising housing sector especially and being adjacent to Mysore Rd connecting  NICE rd ,it's very easy escape for the residents to any part of the Bangalore , metro being sanctioned the land values is going shoot up and estimated time for the metro project 2028 .

References

External links
Wikimapia.org
Mypetrolprice.com
Latlong.in
Taxiautofare.com

Neighbourhoods in Bangalore